The 2017 Cincinnati Reds season was the 148th season for the franchise in Major League Baseball, and their 15th at Great American Ball Park in Cincinnati. The Reds opened the season with a game against the Philadelphia Phillies on April 3 at the Great American Ball Park and finished the season on October 1 against the Chicago Cubs at Wrigley Field. The Reds were eliminated from postseason playoff consideration on September 14, 2017. They equaled their record from the previous season and finished last in their division for the third straight year and missed the playoffs for the fourth straight year.

Offseason
On November 28, Reds claimed outfielder Gabby Guerrero from the Arizona Diamondbacks and catcher Juan Graterol from the Los Angeles Angels off waivers. Keyvius Sampson and Ramon Cabrera were designated for assignment to make room on the 40 man roster. The latter two were later non-tendered, along with Guerrero, though he was later re-signed to a minor league deal.

Standings

National League Central

National League Wildcard

Record vs. opponents

Detailed record

Most Runs Scored in a game: 14 (5/6 vs SF)
Most Runs Allowed in a game: 18 (6/24 at WAS)
Longest Winning Streak: 5 (5/3-5/7)
Longest Losing Streak: 9 (6/9-6/19)

Regular Season Highlights
Opening Day Starting Lineup

May 5–6: The Reds scored a combined 27 runs in two back-to-back games against the San Francisco Giants at Great American Ball Park. This tied the record for most runs for the Reds in two games (occurred previously in 1976).
June 2: Brandon Phillips returns to Great American Ball Park to a standing ovation during his first at-bat since being traded to the Braves. Catcher Devin Mesoraco hits a walk-off solo homerun to left field in the 10th inning, leading to a 3–2 Reds victory.
June 6:  Scooter Gennett became the 17th player in MLB history to hit 4 HR in a single game. His 4 HR were a single-game franchise record and he tied the team record with 10 RBIs.
September 4: Reds outfielder Billy Hamilton hit his first ever game winning walk-off home run against the Milwaukee Brewers. The Reds won 5-4.

Game log 

|- style="background:#fbb"
|1||April 3|| Phillies || 3–4 || Hellickson (1–0) || Feldman (0–1) || Gómez (1) || 43,804 || 0–1 ||  || L1
|- style="background:#cfc"
|2||April 5|| Phillies || 2–0 || Finnegan (1–0) || Eickhoff (0–1) || Iglesias (1) || 19,944 || 1–1 ||  || W1
|- style="background:#cfc"
|3||April 6|| Phillies || 7–4 || Reed (1–0) || Morgan (0–1) || Storen (1) || 10,586 || 2–1 ||  || W2
|- style="background:#cfc"
|4||April 7|| @ Cardinals || 2–0 || Garrett (1–0) || Leake (0–1) || Iglesias (2) || 44,653 || 3–1 ||  || W3 
|- style="background:#fbb"
|5||April 8|| @ Cardinals || 4–10 || Wacha (1–0) || Arroyo (0–1) || — || 46,588 || 3–2 ||  || L1  
|- style="background:#cfc"
|6||April 9|| @ Cardinals || 8–0  || Feldman (1–1) || Martinez (0–1) || — || 45,200 || 4–2 ||  || W1 
|- style="background:#cfc"
|7||April 10|| @ Pirates || 7–1 || Lorenzen (1–0) || Glasnow (0–1) || — || 28,264 || 5–2 ||  || W2
|- style="background:#cfc"
|8||April 11|| @ Pirates || 6–2 || Storen (1–0) || Nicasio (0–1) || Iglesias (3) || 11,027 || 6–2 ||  || W3
|- style="background:#cfc"
|9||April 12|| @ Pirates || 9–2 || Garrett (2–0) || Nova (1–1) || — || 12,327 || 7–2 ||  || W4 
|- style="background:#fbb"
|10||April 13|| Brewers || 1–5 || Nelson (1–0) || Arroyo (0–2) || — || 13,574 || 7–3 ||  || L1 
|- style="background:#fbb"
|11||April 14|| Brewers || 4–10 || Milone (1–0) || Wood (0–1) || — || 23,850 || 7–4 ||  || L2 
|- style="background:#cfc"
|12||April 15|| Brewers || 7–5 || Iglesias (1–0) || Torres (0–1) || Lorenzen (1) || 31,008 || 8–4 ||  || W1 
|- style="background:#fbb"
|13||April 16|| Brewers || 2–4 || Peralta (3–0) || Romano (0–1) || Feliz (4) || 12,625 || 8–5 ||  || L1 
|- style="background:#cfc"
|14||April 18 || Orioles || 9–3 || Arroyo (1–2) || Gausman (1–1) || — || 16,018 || 9–5 ||  || W1 
|- style="background:#fbb"
|15||April 19 || Orioles || 0–2 || Jiménez (1–0)|| Garrett (2–1) || Brach (1) || 15,083 || 9–6 ||  || L1 
|- style="background:#fbb"
|16||April 20 || Orioles || 1–2 (10) || O'Day (1–1) || Wood (0–1) || Brach (2) || 11,910 || 9–7 ||  || L2
|- style="background:#fbb"
|17||April 21 || Cubs || 5–6 (11) || Edwards Jr. (1–1) || Stephenson (0–1) || Davis (4) || 29,350 || 9–8 ||  || L3
|- style="background:#fbb"
|18||April 22|| Cubs || 8–12 || Arrieta (3–0) || Reed (1–1) || — || 27,189 || 9–9 ||  || L4
|- style="background:#cfc"
|19||April 23|| Cubs || 7–5 || Arroyo (2–2) || Lackey (1–3) || — || 32,670 || 10–9 ||  || W1
|- style="background:#fbb"
|20||April 24|| @ Brewers || 7–11 || Torres (1–2) || Garrett (2–2) || — || 23,943 || 10–10 ||  || L1
|- style="background:#fbb"
|21||April 25|| @ Brewers || 1–9 || Davies (2–2) || Feldman (1–2) || Milone (1) || 28,449 || 10–11 ||  || L2
|- style="background:#fbb"
|22||April 26|| @ Brewers || 4–9 || Peralta (4–1) || Davis (0–1)|| — || 19,062 || 10–12 ||  || L3
|- style="background:#fbb"
|23||April 28|| @ Cardinals || 5–7 || Lynn (3–1) || Adleman (0–1)|| Oh (6) || 42,722 || 10–13 ||  || L4
|- style="background:#bbb"
|—||April 29|| @ Cardinals ||colspan="8"|Postponed (rain) (Makeup date: June 26) 
|- style="background:#cfc"
|24||April 30|| @ Cardinals || 5–4 || Peralta (1–0) || Rosenthal (0–1)|| Iglesias (4) || 45,682 || 11–13 ||  || W1
|-

|- style="background:#cfc"
|25||May 1|| Pirates || 4–3 || Lorenzen (2–0) || Hudson (0–1) || — || 14,753 || 12–13 ||  || W2 
|- style="background:#fbb"
|26||May 2|| Pirates || 3–12 || Glasnow (1–1) || Feldman (1–3) || LeBlanc (1) || 13,909 || 12–14 ||  || L1 
|- style="background:#cfc"
|27||May 3|| Pirates || 7–2 || Davis (1–1) || Taillon (2–1) || — || 14,297 || 13–14 ||  || W1 
|- style="background:#cfc"
|28||May 4|| Pirates || 4–2 || Adleman (1–1) || Nova (3–3) || Iglesias (5) || 17,896 || 14–14 ||  || W2
|- style="background:#cfc"
|29||May 5|| Giants || 13–3 ||Arroyo (3–2) || Cain (3–3) || — || 22,724 || 15–14 ||  || W3
|- style="background:#cfc"
|30||May 6|| Giants || 14–2 ||Garrett (3–2) || Blach (3–3) || Stephenson (1) || 20,213 || 16–14 ||  || W4
|- style="background:#cfc"
|31||May 7|| Giants || 4–0 || Feldman (2–3) || Cueto (4–2) || — || 21,142 || 17–14 ||  || W5
|- style="background:#fbb"
|32||May 8|| Yankees || 4–10 || Tanaka (5–1) || Davis (1–2) || — || 25,960 || 17–15 ||  || L1
|- style="background:#cfc"
|33||May 9|| Yankees || 5–3 || Adleman (2–1) || Sabathia (2–2) || Iglesias (6) || 22,035 || 18–15 ||  || W1 
|- style="background:#cfc"
|34||May 11|| @ Giants || 3–2 || Peralta (2–0)  || Strickland (0–1) || Iglesias (7) || 41,493 || 19–15||  || W2
|- style="background:#fbb"
|35||May 12|| @ Giants || 2–3 (17) || Gearrin (1–1) || Stephenson (0–2) || — || 41,325 || 19–16 ||  || L1
|- style="background:#fbb"
|36||May 13|| @ Giants || 1–3 || Moore (2–4) || Bonilla (0–1) || Law (3) || 41,269 || 19–17 ||  || L2
|- style="background:#fbb"
|37||May 14|| @ Giants || 3–8 || Samardzija (1–5) || Adleman (2–2) || — || 42,122 || 19–18 ||  || L3
|- style="background:#fbb"
|38||May 16|| @ Cubs || 5–9 || Lackey (4–3) || Arroyo (3–3) || — || 40,653 || 19–19 ||  || L4
|- style="background:#fbb"
|39||May 17|| @ Cubs || 5–7 || Hendricks (3–2) || Feldman (2–4) || Davis (9) || 38,715 || 19–20 ||  || L5
|- style="background:#fbb"
|40||May 18|| @ Cubs || 5–7 || Lester (2–2) || Garrett (3–3) || Uehara (1) || 36,023 || 19–21 ||  || L6
|- style="background:#fbb"
|41||May 19|| Rockies || 6–12  ||Anderson (3–4) || Bonilla (0–2) || — || 23,184 || 19–22 ||  || L7
|- style="background:#cfc"
|42||May 20|| Rockies || 12–8  || Wojciechowski (1–0) || Dunn (2–1) || — || 25,188 || 20–22 ||  || W1
|- style="background:#fbb"
|43||May 21|| Rockies || 4–6 || Freeland (5–2) || Arroyo (3–4) || Holland (19) || 23,352 || 20–23 ||  || L1
|- style="background:#cfc"
|44||May 22|| Indians || 5–1 || Feldman (3–4) || Tomlin (2–6) || — || 26,794 || 21–23 ||  || W1
|- style="background:#fbb"
|45||May 23|| Indians || 7–8 || Miller (3–0) || Storen (1–1)  || Allen (13) || 26,334 || 21–24 ||  || L1
|- style="background:#cfc"
|46||May 24|| @ Indians || 4–3 || Lorenzen (3–0) || Allen (0–2)  || Iglesias (8) || 19,426 || 22–24 ||  || W1
|- style=background:#bbb
|—||May 25|| @ Indians ||colspan="8"|Postponed (rain) (Makeup date: July 24) 
|- style="background:#cfc"
|47||May 26|| @ Phillies || 5–2 || Adleman (3–2) || Nola (2–2)  || Iglesias (9) || 21,388 || 23–24 ||  || W2
|- style="background:#fbb"
|48||May 27|| @ Phillies || 3–4 || Neris (2–2) || Lorenzen (3–1) || — || 30,100 || 23–25 ||  || L1
|- style="background:#cfc"
|49||May 28|| @ Phillies || 8–4 || Feldman (4–4) || Eflin (3–1) || — || 25,413 || 24–25 ||  || W1
|- style="background:#fbb"
|50||May 29|| @ Blue Jays || 2–17  || Stroman (6–2) ||Bonilla (0–3)  || — || 29,844 || 24–26 ||  || L1
|- style="background:#fbb"
|51||May 30|| @ Blue Jays || 4–6 || Smith (1–0) || Wood (0–3) || Osuna (10) || 32,747 || 24–27 ||  || L2
|- style="background:#fbb"
|52||May 31|| @ Blue Jays || 4–5 || Grilli (2–4)|| Peralta (2–1) || Osuna (11) || 44,058 || 24–28 ||  || L3
|-

|- style="background:#cfc"
|53||June 2|| Braves || 3–2 (10)  || Iglesias (2–0) || Ramirez (2–2) || — || 27,300 || 25–28 ||  || W1
|- style="background:#fbb"
|54||June 3|| Braves || 5–6 (12) || Johnson (3–1) || Wood (0–4) || — || 26,485 || 25–29  ||  ||L1
|- style="background:#fbb"
|55||June 4|| Braves || 8–13  || Teherán (5–4) ||  Garrett (3–4) || — || 26,227 || 25–30 ||  || L2
|- style="background:#cfc"
|56||June 5|| Cardinals || 4–2 || Bonilla (1–3) || Martinez (4–5) || Iglesias (10) || 16,325 || 26–30 ||  || W1
|- style="background:#cfc"
|57||June 6|| Cardinals || 13–1 || Adleman (3–2) || Wainwright (6–4) || — || 18,620 || 27–30 ||  || W2
|- style="background:#cfc"
|58||June 7|| Cardinals || 6–4 || Peralta (3–1) || Cecil (0–2) || Iglesias (11) || 20,891 || 28–30 ||  || W3
|- style="background:#cfc"
|59||June 8|| Cardinals || 5–2 || Feldman (5–4) || Leake (5–5) || Iglesias (12) || 28,917 || 29–30 ||  || W4
|- style="background:#fbb"
|60||June 9|| @ Dodgers || 2–7 ||  Hill (3–2)  || Garrett (3–5)  || Maeda (1) || 44,036 || 29–31||  || L1
|- style="background:#fbb"
|61||June 10|| @ Dodgers || 4–5 || Jansen (4–0) || Storen (1–3) || — || 43,439 || 29–32 ||  || L2
|- style="background:#fbb"
|62||June 11|| @ Dodgers || 7–9 || Avilán (1–1) || Iglesias (2–1) || Jansen (11) || 42,674 || 29–33 ||  || L3
|- style="background:#fbb"
|63||June 12|| @ Padres || 3–9 || Perdomo (1–3) || Arroyo (3–5) || — || 17,006 || 29–34 ||  || L4
|- style="background:#fbb"
|64||June 13|| @ Padres || 2–6 || Richard (5–7) || Feldman (5–5) || Maurer (11) || 20,463 || 29–35 ||  || L5
|- style="background:#fbb"
|65||June 14|| @ Padres || 2–4 || Chacín (6–5) || Lorenzen (3–2) || Maurer (12) || 20,386 || 29–36 ||  || L6
|- style="background:#fbb"
|66||June 16|| Dodgers || 1–3 || Wood (7–0) || Adleman (4–3) ||  Jansen (14) || 35,613 || 29–37 ||  || L7
|- style="background:#fbb"
|67||June 17|| Dodgers || 2–10 || Ryu (3–6) || Wojciechowski (1–1) || — || 42,431 || 29–38 ||  || L8
|- style="background:#fbb"
|68||June 18|| Dodgers || 7–8 || Maeda (5–3) || Arroyo (3–6) || Jansen (15) || 27,316 || 29–39 || || L9
|- style="background:#cfc"
|69||June 19|| @ Rays || 7–3 || Lorenzen (4–2) || Alvarado (0–2) || — || 17,117 || 30–39 ||  || W1
|- style="background:#fbb"
|70||June 20|| @ Rays || 5–6 || Cobb (6–5) || Garrett (3–6) || Colomé (20) || 13,375 || 30–40 ||  || L1
|- style="background:#fbb"
|71||June 21|| @ Rays || 3–8 || Ramírez (4–2) || Adleman (4–4) || Whitley (2) || 19,619 || 30–41 ||  || L2
|- style="background:#fbb"
|72||June 23|| @ Nationals || 5–6 (10) || Albers (3–1) || Iglesias (2–2) || — || 36,347 || 30–42 ||  || L3
|- style="background:#fbb"
|73||June 24|| @ Nationals || 3–18 || Ross (4–3) || Bailey (0–1) || — || 40,139 || 30–43 ||  || L4
|- style="background:#cfc"
|74||June 25|| @ Nationals || 6–2 ||  Feldman (6–5) || Roark (6–5) || — || 35,387 || 31–43 ||  || W1
|- style="background:#fbb"
|75||June 26|| @ Cardinals || 2–8 || Wacha (4–3) || Finnegan (1–1) || — || 46,535 || 31–44 ||  || L1
|- style="background:#cfc"
|76||June 27|| Brewers || 8–6 || Adleman (5–4) || Guerra (1–2) || Iglesias (13) || 18,577 || 32–44 ||  || W1
|- style="background:#cfc"
|77||June 28|| Brewers || 4–3 || Storen (2–2) || Knebel (0–1) || Iglesias (14) || 21,842 || 33–44 ||  || W2 
|- style="background:#fbb"
|78||June 29|| Brewers || 3–11 || Nelson (6–4) || Bailey (0–2) || — || 20,419 || 33–45 ||  || L1 
|- style="background:#cfc"
|79||June 30|| Cubs || 5–0 || Feldman (7–5) || Montgomery (1–5) || — || 39,501 || 34–45 ||  || W1
|-

|- style="background:#cfc"
|80||July 1|| Cubs || 5–3 || Stephens (1–0) || Butler (4–3) || Iglesias (15) || 39,826 || 35–45 ||  || W2
|- style="background:#fbb"
|81||July 2|| Cubs || 2–6 || Arrieta (8–6) || Adleman (5–5) || — || 38,536 || 35–46 ||  || L1
|- style="background:#fbb"
|82||July 3|| @ Rockies || 3–5 || Hoffman (5–1) || Castillo (0–1) || Holland (27) || 49,131 || 35–47 ||  || L2 
|- style="background:#cfc"
|83||July 4|| @ Rockies || 8–1 || Bailey (1–2) || Freeland (8–7) || — || 48,338 || 36–47 ||  || W1
|- style="background:#fbb"
|84||July 5|| @ Rockies || 3–5 || Gray (2–0) || Feldman (7–6)|| Holland (28) || 32,188 || 36–48 ||  || L1
|- style="background:#cfc"
|85||July 6|| @ Rockies || 6–3 || Romano (1–1) || Chatwood (6–10) || — || 27,328 || 37–48 ||  || W1
|- style="background:#fbb"
|86||July 7|| @ D-Backs || 3–6 || Greinke (11–4) || Adleman (5–6) || Rodney (22) || 27,006 || 37–49 ||  || L1 
|- style="background:#cfc"
|87||July 8|| @ D-Backs || 7–0 || Castillo (1–0) || Walker (6–4) || — || 29,806 || 38–49 ||  || W1 
|- style="background:#cfc"
|88||July 9|| @ D-Backs || 2–1 || Bailey (2–2) || Corbin (6–9) || Iglesias (16) || 24,923 || 39–49 ||  ||W2 
|- style="text-align:center; background:#bbcaff;"
| colspan="12" | 2017 Major League Baseball All-Star Game: Miami, Florida at Marlins Park
|- style="background:#fbb"
|89||July 14|| Nationals || 0–5 || González (8–4) || Adleman (5–7) || Grace (1) || 28,916 || 39–50 ||  ||L1
|- style="background:#fbb"
|90||July 15|| Nationals || 7–10 || Scherzer (11–5) || Castillo (1–2) || Grace (2) || 36,462 || 39–51 ||  ||L2
|- style="background:#fbb"
|91||July 16|| Nationals || 4–14 || Roark (7–6) || Bailey (2–3) || — || 25,712 || 39–52 ||  ||L3
|- style="background:#fbb"
|92||July 17|| Nationals || 1–6 || Strasburg (10–3) || Feldman (7–7) || — || 17,574 || 39–53 ||  ||L4
|- style="background:#fbb"
|93||July 18|| D-Backs || 2–11 || Ray (9–4) || Romano (1–2) || — || 19,989 || 39–54 ||  ||L5 
|- style="background:#cfc"
|94||July 19|| D-Backs || 4–3 (11) || Lorenzen (5–2) || McFarland (4–2) || — || 16,573 || 40–54 ||  || W1
|- style="background:#fbb"
|95||July 20|| D-Backs || 2–12 || Corbin (7–9) || Castillo (1–3) || — || 19,711 || 40–55 ||  || L1
|- style="background:#fbb"
|96||July 21|| Marlins || 1–3 || Ureña (8–4)  || Bailey (2–4) || Ramos (18) || 21,851 || 40–56 ||  || L2
|- style="background:#fbb"
|97||July 22|| Marlins || 4–5 || Wittgren (3–1) || Stephenson (0–3) ||  Ramos (19) || 24,099 || 40–57 ||  || L3 
|- style="background:#cfc"
|98||July 23|| Marlins || 6–3 || Romano (2–2) || Koehler (1–5) || Igiesias (17) || 20,526 || 41–57 ||  || W1
|- style="background:#fbb"
|99||July 24|| @ Indians || 2–6 || Tomlin (7–9) || Adleman (5–8) || — || 21,500 || 41–58 ||  || L1
|- style="background:#fbb"
|100||July 25|| @ Yankees || 2–4 || Montgomery (7–5) || Castillo (1–4) || Chapman (12) || 44,268|| 41–59 ||  || L2
|- style="background:#fbb"
|101||July 26|| @ Yankees || 5–9 || Severino (7–4) || Bailey (2–5) || — || 42,421 || 41–60 ||  || L3
|- style="background:#fbb"
|102||July 27|| @ Marlins || 1–4 || O'Grady (2–1) || Stephenson (0–4) || Ramos (20) || 19,986 || 41–61 ||  || L4
|- style="background:#fbb"
|103||July 28|| @ Marlins || 4–7 || McGowan (6–1) || Peralta (3–2) || — || 17,440 || 41–62 ||  || L5 
|- style="background:#fbb"
|104||July 29|| @ Marlins || 3–7 || Conley (4–3) || Adleman (5–9) || — || 20,297 || 41–63 ||  || L6
|- style="background:#cfc"
|105||July 30|| @ Marlins || 6–4 || Castillo (2–4) || Straily (7–7) || — || 19,947 || 42–63 ||  || W1
|-

|- style="background:#cfc"
|106||August 1|| @ Pirates || 9–1 || Bailey (3–5) || Taillon (6–5)|| — || 22,403 || 43–63 ||  || W2
|- style="background:#cfc"
|107||August 2|| @ Pirates || 5–2 || Lorenzen (6–2) || Benoit (1–5) || Iglesias (18) || 22,367 || 44–63 ||  || W3
|- style="background:#fbb"
|108||August 3|| @ Pirates || 0–6 || Kuhl (4–7) || Romano (2–3) || — || 25,955 || 44–64 ||  || L1
|- style="background:#cfc"
|109||August 4|| Cardinals || 3–2 || Wojciechowski (2–1) || Leake (7–10) || Iglesias (19) || 36,443 || 45–64 ||  || W1
|- style="background:#fbb"
|110||August 5|| Cardinals || 1–4 || Lynn (10–6) || Castillo (2–5) || Rosenthal (8) || 35,571 || 45–65 ||  || L1
|- style="background:#fbb"
|111||August 6|| Cardinals || 4–13 || Cecil (2–4) || Bailey (3–6)|| — || 25,168 || 45–66 ||  ||L2
|- style="background:#cfc"
|112||August 7|| Padres || 11–3 || Wood (1–4) || Chacín (11–8) || — || 16,240 || 46–66 ||   ||W1
|- style="background:#fbb"
|113||August 8|| Padres || 3–7 || Perdomo (6–6) || Romano (2–4) || — || 13,683 || 46–67 ||  ||L1
|- style="background:#cfc"
|114||August 9|| Padres || 8–3 || Wojciechowski (3–1) || Wood (2–4) || — || 15,450 || 47–67 ||  ||W1
|- style="background:#cfc"
|115||August 10|| Padres || 10–3 || Storen (3–2) || Yates (2–3)|| — || 14,915 || 48–67||  || W2
|- style="background:#cfc"
|116||August 11|| @ Brewers || 11–10 || Bailey (4–6) || Nelson (9–6) || Iglesias (20) || 34,517 || 49–67 ||  || W3
|- style="background:#fbb"
|117||August 12|| @ Brewers || 5–6 (10) || Knebel (1–2) || Adleman (5–10) || — || 38,256 || 49–68 ||  || L1
|- style="background:#fbb"
|118||August 13|| @ Brewers || 4–7 || Garza (6–6) || Romano (2–5) || Knebel (22) || 43,248  || 49–69 ||  || L2
|- style="background:#fbb"
|119||August 14|| @ Cubs || 5–15 || Quintana (7–10) || Wojciechowski (3–2) || — || 40,263 || 49–70 ||  || L3
|- style="background:#cfc"
|120||August 15|| @ Cubs || 2–1 || Lorenzen (7–2) || Strop (3–3) || Iglesias (21) || 36,698 || 50–70 ||  || W1
|- style="background:#fbb"
|121||August 16|| @ Cubs || 6–7 || Davis (3–1) || Peralta (3–3) || — || 37,021 || 50–71 ||  || L1
|- style="background:#cfc"
|122||August 17|| @ Cubs || 13–10 || Storen (4–2) || Grimm (1–2) || Iglesias (22) || 38,675 || 51–71 ||  || W1
|- style="background:#cfc"
|123||August 18|| @ Braves || 5–3 || Romano (3–5) || Dickey (8–8) || Iglesias (23) || 31,174 || 52–71 ||  || W2
|- style="background:#cfc"
|124||August 19|| @ Braves || 11–8 || Stephenson (1–4) || Teherán (7–11) || — || 39,317 || 53–71 ||  || W3
|- style="background:#fbb"
|125||August 20|| @ Braves || 1–8 || Newcomb (2–7) || Castillo (2–6) || — || 25,758 || 53–72 ||  || L1
|- style="background:#fbb"
|126||August 22|| Cubs || 9–13 || Rondón (4–1) || Peralta (3–4) || — || 16,467 || 53–73 ||  || L2
|- style="background:#fbb"
|127||August 23|| Cubs || 3–9 || Montgomery (4–6) || Wojciechowski (3–3) || — || 15,355 || 53–74 ||  || L3
|- style="background:#cfc"
|128||August 24|| Cubs || 4–2 || Lorenzen (8–2) || Strop (3–4) || Iglesias (24) || 18,191 || 54–74 ||  || W1
|- style="background:#cfc"
|129||August 25|| Pirates || 9–5 || Stephenson (2–4) || Nova (11–11) || — || 20,561 || 55–74 ||  || W2
|- style="background:#fbb"
|130||August 26|| Pirates || 0–1 || Cole (11–8) || Castillo (2–7) || Rivero (15) || 35,259 || 55–75 ||  || L1
|- style="background:#fbb"
|131||August 27|| Pirates || 2–5 || Schugel (3–0) || Mahle (0–1) || Rivero (16) || 26,155 || 55–76 ||  || L2
|- style="background:#cfc"
|132||August 29|| Mets || 14–4 || Romano (4–5) || Flexen (3–3) || — || 12,946 || 56–76 ||  || W1
|- style="background:#fbb"
|133||August 30|| Mets || 0–2 || Montero (3–9) || Bailey (4–7) || Ramos (26) || 12,491 || 56–77 ||  || L1
|- style="background:#cfc"
|134||August 31|| Mets || 7–2 || Stephenson (3–4) || deGrom (14–8) || — || 13,634 || 57–77 ||  || W1
|-

|- style="background:#cfc"
|135|| September 1 || @ Pirates || 7–3 || Wojciechowski (4–3) || Cole (11–9) || — || 23,569 || 58–77 ||  || W2
|- style="background:#fbb"
|136|| September 2 || @ Pirates || 0–5 || Schugel (4–0) || Lorenzen (8–3) || — || 23,529 || 58–78 ||  || L1
|- style="background:#fbb"
|137|| September 3 || @ Pirates || 1–3 || Williams (6–7) || Romano (4–6) || Rivero (17) || 24,474 || 58–79 ||  || L2
|- style="background:#cfc"
|138|| September 4 || Brewers || 5–4 || Iglesias (3–2) || Hader (1–3) || — || 22,403 || 59–79 ||  || W1
|- style="background:#cfc"
|139|| September 5 || Brewers || 9–3 || Stephenson (4–4) || Davies (16–8) || Iglesias (25) || 12,135 || 60–79 ||  || W2
|- style="background:#cfc"
|140|| September 6 || Brewers || 7–1 || Castillo (3–7) || Garza (6–9) || — || 12,626 || 61–79 ||  || W3
|- style="background:#fbb"
|141|| September 7 || @ Mets || 2–7 || Harvey (5–4) || Mahle (0–2) || — || 21,274 || 61–80 ||  || L1
|- style="background:#fbb"
|142|| September 8 || @ Mets || 1–5 || Lugo (6–4) || Garrett (3–7) || Ramos (27) || 25,864 || 61–81 ||  || L2
|- style="background:#fbb"
|143|| September 9 || @ Mets || 1–6 || Montero (5–9) || Bailey (4–8) || — || 30,661 || 61–82 ||  || L3
|- style="background:#cfc"
|144|| September 10 || @ Mets || 10–5 || Stephens (2–0) || Familia (1–2) || Iglesias (26) || 27,590 || 62–82 ||  || W1
|- style="background:#fbb"
|145|| September 12 || @ Cardinals || 4–13 || Lynn (11–7) || Stephenson (4–5) || — || 40,030 || 62–83 ||  || L1
|- style="background:#cfc"
|146|| September 13 || @ Cardinals || 6–0 || Mahle (1–2) || Flaherty (0–1) || — || 40,124 || 63–83 ||  || W1
|- style="background:#fbb"
|147|| September 14 || @ Cardinals || 2–5 || Weaver (6–1) || Garrett (3–8) || — || 40,230 || 63–84 ||  || L1
|- style="background:#cfc"
|148|| September 15 || Pirates || 4–2 || Bailey (5–8) || Kuhl (7–11) || Iglesias (27) || 17,625 || 64–84 ||  || W1
|- style="background:#cfc"
|149|| September 16 || Pirates || 2–1 || Romano (5–6) || Nova (11–14) || Reed (1) || 25,685 || 65–84 ||  || W2
|- style="background:#cfc"
|150|| September 17 || Pirates || 5–2 || Stephenson (5–5) || Cole (11–11) || Lorenzen (2) || 22,228 || 66–84 ||  || W3
|- style="background: #fbb"
|151|| September 19 || Cardinals || 7–8 (10) || Nicasio (4–5) || Adleman (5–11) || Lyons (3) || 17,165 || 66–85 ||  || L1
|- style="background:#fbb"
|152|| September 20 || Cardinals || 2–9 || Weaver (7–1) || Davis (1–3) || — || 12,903 || 66–86 ||  || L2
|- style="background:#fbb"
|153|| September 21 || Cardinals || 5–8 || Martinez (12–11) || Bailey (5–9) || — || 14,803 || 66–87 ||  || L3
|- style="background:#fbb"
|154|| September 22 || Red Sox || 4–5 || Price (6–3) || Romano (5–7) || Kimbrel (34) || 23,463 || 66–88 ||  || L4
|- style="background:#fbb"
|155|| September 23 || Red Sox || 0–5 || Rodriguez (6–6) || Stephenson (5–6) || —  || 36,076 || 66–89 ||  || L5
|- style="background:#fbb"
|156|| September 24 || Red Sox ||  4–5 || Scott (2–1) || Iglesias (3–3) || Kimbrel (35) || 25,545 || 66–90 ||  || L6
|- style="background:#fbb"
|157|| September 26 || @ Brewers || 6–7 || Hader (2–3) || McGuire (0–1) || Knebel (38) || 30,079 || 66–91 ||  || L7
|- style="background:#cfc"
|158|| September 27 || @ Brewers || 6–0 || Bailey (6–9) || Woodruff (2–3) || — || 34,882 || 67–91 ||  || W1
|- style="background:#fbb"
|159|| September 28 || @ Brewers || 3–4 || Hughes (5–3) || Romano (5–8) || Knebel (39) || 30,293 || 67–92 ||  || L1
|- style="background:#fbb"
|160|| September 29 || @ Cubs || 4–5 || Duensing (1–1) || Lorenzen (8–4) || Grimm (1) || 36,258 || 67–93 ||  || L2
|- style="background:#fbb"
|161|| September 30 || @ Cubs || 0–9 || Lester (13–8) || Stephens (2–1) || — || 41,493 || 67–94 ||  || L3
|- style="background:#cfc"
|162|| October 1 || @ Cubs || 3–1 || McGuire (1–1) || Lackey (12–12 ) || Iglesias (28) || 40,971 || 68–94 ||  || W1
|-

|- style="text-align:center;"
| Legend:       = Win       = Loss       = PostponementBold = Reds team member

Roster

Statistics
Players in bold are on the active MLB roster as of the 2022 season.

Final batting and pitching stats .

Batting
Note: G = Games played; AB = At bats; R = Runs scored; H = Hits; 2B = Doubles; 3B = Triples; HR = Home runs; RBI = Runs batted in; AVG = Batting average;  SB = Stolen bases

Pitching
Note: W = Wins; L = Losses; ERA = Earned run average; G = Games pitched; GS = Games started; SV = Saves; IP = Innings pitched; H = Hits allowed; R = Runs allowed; ER = Earned runs allowed; BB = Walks allowed; SO = Strikeouts

Farm system

See also
 List of Major League Baseball single-game home run leaders
 List of Major League Baseball single-game runs batted in leaders

References

External links
 Official Website 
2017 Cincinnati Reds season at Baseball Reference

Cincinnati Reds seasons
Cincinnati Reds
2017 in sports in Ohio